A friction drive  or friction engine is a type of transmission that utilises two wheels in the transmission to transfer power from the engine to the driving wheels. The system is naturally a continuously variable transmission; by moving the two disks' positions, the output ratio changes continually. Although once used in early automobiles, today the system is most commonly used  on scooters, mainly go-peds, in place of a chain and gear system. It is mechanically identical to a ball-and-disk integrator, but intended to handle higher torque levels.

The system consists of two disks, normally metal, set at right angles to each other. One disk is connected to the engine, the other to the load. The load disk is positioned so that its outer rim is pressed against the driven disk, and normally has some sort of high-friction surface applied to the outer rim to improve torque transfer. In early systems, paper and leather was often used for this surface. One of the disks, normally the load side, is mounted on a shaft that allows it to be moved in relation to the driven disk, allowing it to move from a position at the center of the driven disk to its outer radius. Moving the load disk along this shaft changes the ratio of input to output speed; when the load disk is at the center the output is zero, when it is at the outer rim, it is the ratio of the radius of the two disks.

While mechanically simple and providing a variable transmission that requires no clutch, there are a number of problems with the design that limit its use. The first is that the amount of torque that can be transferred is a function of the contact patch between the two disks, and thus a function of the width of the load disk. Increasing this width improves torque handling, but then runs into a second problem. As the "gear ratio" is a function of the distance from the center of the driven disk, any finite thickness on the driven disk means the inner and outer edges are being driven at different speeds. This causes considerable friction on the bearing surface, wearing it out and giving off significant amounts of heat. This results in a sweet spot that limits it to certain low-torque roles.

In phonographs
Friction  drive has been most successfully used in low-power applications, such as driving phonograph turntables.

In automobiles

Automobiles using this drive system included the Anglo-Dane, the Arista, the Armadale, the Astra, the Allvelo, the Bukh & Gry, the Cartercar, the Crown 12HP Model Two (1905-1906), the Davis Totem, the Kelsey, the Lambert, the LuLu, the Metz, the Ner-a Car, the Richardson and the Turicum.  The Turicum's friction drive consisted of a flat steel disk coupled directly to the engine.  This primary disk subsequently drove a smaller leather covered wheel oriented normal to its surface.  Assuming a constant rotational velocity on the primary wheel, the angular velocity on the disk's surface will increase proportionally to the distance from the center of rotation.  Therefore, positioning the smaller wheel at different points along the larger wheel's surface varies the gear ratio.  Furthermore, since there are no limitations beyond the minimum and maximum positions, the gear ratios are infinitely adjustable. The Lambert's friction drive (illustrated) was similar but used an aluminium-faced driving disk and a fiber-faced driven wheel.

In railway locomotives
Plymouth Locomotive Works's first three models, the AL, BL and CL were equipped with a friction drive.

Early models of the permanent way maintenance ganger's Wickham trolley used a vee-twin JAP engine. This drove through a large flat flywheel and a friction drive.

Belt drives

A belt drive is a form of friction drive but is usually categorized separately from the "disk and wheel" type of friction drive.

See also

References

External links 
 Animated image of a toroidal CVT on HowStuffWorks 

Automotive transmission technologies
Continuously variable transmissions